The order of battle for Operation Chahar, in the history of the Second Sino-Japanese War (1937–1945), was:

Orbat for Operation Chahar 

Japan

Peiping Railway Garrison Force, Nan-kou Front - Gen. Kiyoshi Katsuki [1] [4]
 5th Division – Gen. Seishiro Itagaki[4]
 9th Infantry Brigade
 11th Infantry Regiment
 41st Infantry Regiment
 21st Infantry Brigade
 21st Infantry Regiment
 42nd Infantry Regiment
 5th Mountain Artillery Regiment
 5th Cavalry Regiment
 5th Engineer Regiment
 5th Transport Regiment
 4th Tank Battalion from Sakai Brigade -
 11th Independent Mixed Brigade- Gen. Shigeyasu Suzuki
 11th Independent Infantry Regiment
 12th Independent Infantry Regiment
 11th Independent Cavalry Company
 11th Independent Field Artillery Regiment
 12th Independent Mountain Gun Regiment
 11th Independent Engineer Company
 11th Independent Transport Company
 Tank Unit – from China Stationed Tank Unit

Kwangtung Army [1] [4]
 Manchukuo 5th District Army - General Shigero Fujii [7]
 Jehol Detachment
 Chahar Expeditionary Force - Lt. General Hideki Tojo[5], Kalgan Front
 1st Independent Mixed Brigade (Sakai Brigade)- Lt. Gen Sakai Koji
 4th Tank Battalion - ? [6]
 12 x Type 89 Medium Tanks
 13 x Type 95 Light Tanks
 12 x Type 94 Tankettes
 4 x Armored Engineer Vehicles
 1st Independent Infantry Regiment
 1st Independent Artillery Battalion
 1st Independent Engineer Company
 2nd Mixed Brigade - Major Gen Masaki Honda [5](from 1st Division) Kwangtung Army)
 1st Infantry Regiment - Col Sogawa[5]
 3rd Infantry Regiment - Col Yuasa[5]
 3rd Battalion/57th Infantry Regiment
 2nd Co./1st Cavalry Regiment
 4th Battalion/1st Field Artillery Regiment
 1st Co./1st Engineer Regiment
 Ohizumi Detachment (大泉支隊) - ? [7]
 one battalion / 4th Infantry Regiment / 2nd Division
 15th Mixed Brigade – Major Gen. Seiichiro Shinohara (from 2nd Division, Kwangtung Army)
 16th Infantry Regiment - Col Goto [5]
 30th Infantry Regiment - Col Ikagura [5]
 2nd Cavalry Regiment - Lt Col Honda[5]
 2nd Field Artillery Regiment - Col Takahashi[5]
 2nd Engineer Regiment - Col Ito[5]
 2nd Transport Regiment
 Mongolian Army – Prince Teh Wang, Pao Yueh-ching [2]
 1st Cavalry Division
 2nd Cavalry Division
 3rd Cavalry Division
 4th Cavalry Division
 5th Cavalry Division
 6th Cavalry Division
 7th Cavalry Division
 8th Cavalry Division
 2nd Air Group Operation Quhar - ? [3]
 12th Air Regiment 2 bomber squadrons Ki-2
 15th Air Regiment 4 scout plane squadrons Ki-4's and Ki.15's
 2nd Battalion / 16th Air Regiment Ki-10
2 fighter squadrons, 4 scout plane squadrons, 2 bomber squadrons,

Airforce:
 Rinji Hikodan[3]
 1st Hiko Daitai/16th Hiko Rentai [Kawasaki Ki-10]
 1st Chutai
 2nd Chutai
 Light bomber daitai/16th Hiko Rentai [Type 88 reconnaissance aircraft]
 2nd Hiko Daitai [Kawasaki Ki-10]
 1st Chutai
 2nd Chutai
 8th Hiko Daitai[Kawasaki Ki-10]
 1st Chutai
 2nd Chutai
 12th Hiko Rentai [Mitsubishi Ki-2 Type 94 observation aircraft]
 Dokuritsu Hiko Dai 3 Chutai (Independent Company). Army Tipe 93 Heavy Bomber Mitsubishi Ki-1. 9 Aircraft
 Independent 4th Dokuritsu Hiko Chutai [Reconnaissance squadron ]
 Independent 6th Dokuritsu Hiko Chutai [Reconnaissance squadron ]
 Independent 9th Dokuritsu Hiko Chutai [Kawasaki Ki-10]

Notes:
 Kwangtung Army and Chahar Expeditionary Force were under the command of Central Supreme Command but were not under unified command on the battlefield in this campaign.
 11th Independent Mixed Brigade was subordinated to Kwangtung Army, At the end of July it was attached to Peiping Railway Garrison Force. In early September, it reverted to the Chahar Expeditionary Force.
 2nd and 15th Mixed Brigades were detachments from Divisions of the Kwangtung Army.

Sources
 Jowett, Phillip S., Rays of The Rising Sun, Armed Forces of Japan's Asian Allies 1931-45, Volume I: China & Manchuria, 2004. Helion & Co. Ltd., 26 Willow Rd., Solihull, West Midlands, England.
 Japanese Square Divisions from Madej's reprint of wartime US intelligence manual.
 Madej, W. Victor. Japanese Armed Forces Order of Battle, 1937-1945 [2 vols]. Allentown, PA: 1981
 Operation Quhar, http://www3.plala.or.jp/takihome/history.htm

Chahar
Chahar
Chahar